Ruseni is a commune in Edineț District, Moldova. It is composed of two villages, Ruseni and Slobodca.

Notable people
 Anatol Ciobanu

References

Communes of Edineț District